Sullia Assembly constituency is one of the 224 Legislative Assembly constituencies of Karnataka state in India.

It is part of Dakshina Kannada district and is reserved for candidates belonging to the Scheduled Castes.

Members of the Legislative Assembly

Election results

2018

See also
 List of constituencies of the Karnataka Legislative Assembly
 Dakshina Kannada district

References

Dakshina Kannada district
Assembly constituencies of Karnataka